Roland Paskoff (20 March 1933 – 14 September 2005) was a French geologist expert in coastal geomorphology including Holocene tectonics and sea level change. While he was active studying the coast of the countries where he held university positions—that is Chile, France and Tunisia— he also conducted studies in Bahrain, Malta, the Seychelles and the Mascarene Islands.

References

1933 births
2005 deaths
Academic staff of Tunis University
20th-century French geologists
French geomorphologists
University of Bordeaux alumni
Academic staff of the University of Chile